Beniarjó is a municipality in the comarca of Safor in the Valencian Community, Spain.

Notable people
 Ausiàs March (1400 – March 3, 1459), a medieval Valencian poet and knight from Gandia

References

Municipalities in the Province of Valencia
Safor